WETC (540 kHz) is an AM radio station, licensed to the cities of Wendell and Zebulon, North Carolina. It is owned by Divine Mercy Radio, Inc., a 501(c)(3) corporation. It is an all-volunteer, independently owned, non-commercial radio station that airs a Catholic radio format. The call letters now stand for We're EveryThing Catholic. The station's is known as Catholic 540-AM Divine Mercy Radio and is 100% listener supported. The station's signal targets the Research Triangle region of North Carolina, including the Raleigh radio market. In addition to Raleigh and Durham, other North Carolina cities and towns within the station's primary broadcast radius include Apex, Butner, Cary, Chapel Hill, Clayton, Fuquay-Varina, Garner, Goldsboro, Hillsborough, Holly Springs, Kinston, Knightdale, Morrisville, Rocky Mount, Smithfield, Wake Forest, Wendell, Wilson & Zebulon.

History
On June 16, 1959, WETC first signed on the air.  It was a 250 watt daytimer.  Because AM 540 is a clear-channel frequency reserved for Canada and Mexico, WETC had to sign-off every evening at sunset to avoid interfering with skywave signals of other radio stations.  It was later allowed to broadcast at night, but only with reduced power.

WETC's call letters originally were said to stand for "We Entertain Tobacco Country." It was a long-time country music station. In 1992 it became the first radio station to target the Research Triangle's Spanish-speaking community. It went completely Spanish by the late 1990s. WETC was owned by East Wake Broadcasting and later Carolina Regional Broadcasting before being sold to Prieto Communications in 2004.

Prieto Communications sold WETC to Marta Sanchez's Sanchez Broadcasting Corporation for consideration of the forgiveness of $1.45 million in debt; the transaction was consummated on January 4, 2013.

WETC's programming was once simulcast on AM 1490 WDUR in Durham, North Carolina. That station now airs a South Asian format.

On March 25, 2016, WETC was granted a construction permit from the Federal Communications Commission (FCC) to increase its daytime power to 10,000 watts.

Effective August 31, 2018, Sanchez Broadcasting sold WETC to Divine Mercy Radio, Inc. for $850,000. On October 1, 2018, Divine Mercy Radio filed a Remain Silent Authority application with the FCC, citing major technical issues. At the time, the station was expected to remain off the air for 120 days while technicians made repairs. WETC resumed regular operations at 3:55 p.m. EST on February 4, 2019.

References

External links

Catholic radio stations
ETC
Radio stations established in 1959
1959 establishments in North Carolina